This is a list of lieutenant-governors of the North-Western Provinces. The provisional establishment of the lieutenant-governors of the North-Western Provinces happened in 1836 until the title was merged with Chief Commissioners of Oudh and was renamed as lieutenant-governors of the North-Western Provinces and chief commissioners of Oudh in 1877.

Lieutenant-governors of the North-Western Provinces (1836–1877) 
The governorship of Agra was never fully carried out, and in 1835 another statute authorized the appointment of a lieutenant-governor for the North-Western Provinces.

See also 
 (1732–1857) – Nawabs of Awadh
 (1834–1836) – Governors of Agra
 (1856–1877) – Chief Commissioners of Oudh
 (1877–1902) – Lieutenant Governors of the North-Western Provinces and Chief Commissioners of Oudh
 (1902–1921) – Lieutenant Governors of the United Provinces of Agra and Oudh
 (1921–1937) – Governors of the United Provinces of British India
 (1937–1950) – Governors of the United Provinces
 (1950–cont.) – Governors of Uttar Pradesh

References 

 Provinces of British India
 The India List and India Office List By India Office, Great Britain

British administration in Uttar Pradesh
Lieutenant Governors